Ullrich disease is a genetic extracellular matrix diseases of the skin characterized by puffy skin.

See also 
 Ehlers–Danlos syndrome
 List of cutaneous conditions

References 

Abnormalities of dermal fibrous and elastic tissue